Tilen Sirše (born 21 December 1990) is a Slovenian slider.

Sirše represented Slovenia in Men's singles at the 2018 Winter Olympics in Pyeongchang, South Korea.

References

External links
 

1990 births
Living people
Slovenian male lugers
Lugers at the 2018 Winter Olympics
Olympic lugers of Slovenia